The Clean Slate Program was an interdisciplinary research program at Stanford University which considered how the Internet could be redesigned with a "clean slate", without the accumulated complexity of existing systems but using the experience gained in their decades of development.
Its program director was Nick McKeown.

Program outline
Clean Slate was based on the belief that the current Internet has significant deficiencies that need to be solved before it can become a unified global communication infrastructure, and that the Internet's shortcomings will not be resolved by the conventional incremental and backward-compatible style of academic and industrial networking research.

The research program focused on unconventional, bold, and long-term research that tries to break the network's ossification. To this end, the program was characterized by two research questions:
 "With what we know today, if we were to start again with a clean slate, how would we design a global communications infrastructure?"
 "How should the Internet look in upcoming 15 years?"

Program coordinators identified five key areas for research:
 Network architecture
 Heterogeneous applications
 Heterogeneous physical-layer technologies
 Security
 Economics and policy

The Clean Slate Program ceased in January 2012, after spawning four major follow-up projects:
 Internet Infrastructure: OpenFlow and Software Defined Networking
 Mobile Internet: POMI 2020
 Mobile Social Networking: MobiSocial
 Data Center: Stanford Experimental Data Center Lab

References

External links
 Stanford MobiSocial Computing Laboratory
 POMI 2020: Programmable Open Mobile Internet
 Stanford Experimental Data Center Lab
 Topical Coder—Broken Internet

Internet architecture